Tunde Onakoya is a Nigerian chess master, coach and founder of Chess in Slums Africa. He has organized a number of interventions for children across slums in Lagos state including Majidun (Ikorodu), Makoko and recently, Oshodi. The children are engaged in a 2 week's session that seeks to unlock their potential through the game of chess while learning to read, write and acquire basic literacy skills.

Background and career 
Onakoya learned to play chess at a barber's shop in a slum in Ikorodu, Lagos where he grew up. Being unable to pay for his secondary school, his mother offered to work for a school as a cleaner in exchange for his school fees. He would later be ranked as the number 13 chess player in Nigeria.

Onakoya got a diploma in computer science at Yaba College of Technology where he was a gold medalist representing the school in Nigeria Polytechnic Games and also at the RCCG Chess Championship. He has also won the National Friends of Chess and the Chevron Chess Open.

Onakoya was featured in CNN African Voices.

Onakoya is a board member of the New York City based non-profit The Gift of Chess.

Chess in Slums Africa 
In September 2018, Chess in Slums Africa started as a volunteer driven non-profit organization that aims to empower young ones in impoverished communities through chess.

Chess in Slums Africa partnered with Chess.com in September 2020 as an educational tool for classrooms, chess clubs, and parents.

As of June 2021, Chess in Slums Africa had trained over 200 children and got lifelong scholarships for 20 of them.

In May 2021, Ferdinand, a 10-year-old boy with cerebral palsy won the chess tournament in Makoko. He later met and competed with Babajide Sanwo-Olu, the governor of Lagos State.

References 

Year of birth missing (living people)
Living people
Chess coaches